A Plumbing We Will Go is a 1940 short subject directed by Del Lord starring American slapstick comedy team The Three Stooges (Moe Howard, Larry Fine and Curly Howard). It is the 46th entry in the series released by Columbia Pictures starring the comedians, who released 190 shorts for the studio between 1934 and 1959.

Plot
The Stooges started out as homeless thieving beggars and are put on trial for stealing chickens. After being acquitted on a charge of chicken stealing, the Stooges attempt to catch a live fish from a pet store aquarium tank. A beat cop (Bud Jamison) catches them in action and gives chase, forcing the boys to pose as plumbers to avoid being incarcerated.

Unfortunately due to their incompetence, The Stooges manage to destroy the entire plumbing system in the home in grand fashion. Curly attempts to repair what he believes is a leak in the upstairs bathroom and ends up constructing a maze of pipes that traps him. Larry digs up the front lawn in fruitless search of the water shutoff valve. In addition, Moe and Curly end up connecting a water pipe with another nearby pipe housing electrical wires, leading to water exiting every electrical appliance in the mansion, resulting in much comedic suffering for the mansion’s bewildered chef (Dudley Dickerson). When a hostess invites her guests to watch Niagara Falls on her new television set, the whole company gets doused with water (therefore leading to the invention of 4-D television).

The homeowner arrives to see his house in shambles and accidentally undoes the Stooges' convoluted repair work. As they are about to reprimand him, it becomes clear that the homeowner happens to be the judge who found them innocent a few hours earlier; in the last scene the Three Stooges are running away while being chased by the Judge, his butler and the police.

Production notes
A Plumbing We Will Go was filmed on December 13–18, 1939. It was the last Stooge short filmed in the 1930s. It was a remake of the Sidney and Murray short film, Plumbing for Gold (1934), and would be remade again with El Brendel and Shemp Howard as Pick a Peck of Plumbers (1944). The Stooges remade A Plumbing We Will Go as Vagabond Loafers (1949) and Scheming Schemers (1956) using stock footage. The original story in Plumbing for Gold involved searching for a lost ring which the Stooges did not use until Scheming Schemers.

Curly recreated the maze-of-pipes gag several years later in Swing Parade of 1946 (1946). Shemp Howard attempted it as well in Vagabond Loafers and Scheming Schemers, while Joe DeRita also attempted the gag in Have Rocket, Will Travel (1959). The chicken-stealing segment that opens the film was also reworked in Listen, Judge (1952).

Aside from the aforementioned reworked films, footage from A Plumbing We Will Go also reappeared in the compilation feature film Stop! Look! and Laugh! (1960).

Like A Ducking They Did Go (1939), the title is a play on the children's song, "A-Hunting We Will Go".

Reception
A Plumbing We Will Go is considered a quintessential Three Stooges film. Ranking as a consistent fan favorite, the film was also a favorite of star Curly Howard.

As of 2010, A Plumbing We Will Go is the highest-rated Three Stooges film on the Internet Movie Database.

See also
Three Stooges Filmography

References

External links
 
 
A Plumbing We Will Go at threestooges.net

1940 films
1940 comedy films
The Three Stooges films
American black-and-white films
Films directed by Del Lord
Columbia Pictures short films
American slapstick comedy films
1940s English-language films
1940s American films